Three Days Grace is the debut studio album by Canadian rock band Three Days Grace, released on July 22, 2003, through Jive Records. It was the band's only album as a trio, and also under Bertelsmann Music Group.

Background and writing
Prior to being named Three Days Grace, the band was known as Groundswell. Three Days Grace garnered the attention of many record labels after the release of their demo, largely due to the song, "I Hate Everything About You". Eventually, Three Days Grace signed with Jive and began recording their debut album in Massachusetts. The single "I Hate Everything About You" was released in promotion for the album. 

According to drummer Neil Sanderson, the albums material comes from the "crazy things" the group had seen growing up. Singer Adam Gontier stated, "I don't find it easy to write about happy shit. You don't need a release when you're happy." The group completed half of the album at Long View Farm in North Brookfield, Massachusetts, while the rest was done at Bearsville Studios in Bearsville, New York. The group spent roughly six months to record the album, while the songs on the record were written over the course of ten years.

To support the album, the band went on tour in 2004 called the "Three Days Grace World Tour". The group also supported Nickelback on "The Long Road Tour" in 2003, Evanescence on a North American tour and Hoobastank on the "Let it Out Tour" in 2004.

Critical reception

The album was met with positive reviews from most music critics. Heather Phares of AllMusic gave the album a positive review, saying, "Although this debut is a little uneven, it's also promising. Three Days Grace are definitely one of the most accessible alt-metal bands of the 2000s; they just need to add some more distinctiveness to their sound." Dave Doray of IGN gave another positive review, saying, "almost every single song from the Three Days Grace track list is heavy and catchy, with chewy chunks of assurance and fury thrown in for added measure." However, Spin gave a more negative review calling the album, "generic Canadian gripe rock."

Commercial performance
Three Days Grace debuted at No. 194 on the Billboard 200 and in its first week, the album sold no more than 34,000 copies. The album later peaked at No. 69 on the Billboard 200 in 2004 and sold 356,000 copies that year. As of 2006, the album sold over 1.2 million copies in the US. The album also entered the Canadian Albums Chart at No. 9 and sold 5,000 copies in its first week. According to the Nielsen SoundScan, the album has since sold over 335,000 units in Canada.

Accolades
The album has been certified platinum in Canada and 2× Platinum in the US. The lead single "I Hate Everything About You" was nominated for "Best Rock Video" and "People's Choice: Favourite Canadian Group" at the 2004 MuchMusic Video Awards. Producer Gavin Brown won "Producer of the Year" for the song at the 2004 Juno Awards.

Track listing

Personnel
Credits adapted from the album's liner notes.

Three Days Grace
Adam Gontier – lead vocals, guitars
Brad Walst – bass guitar
Neil Sanderson – drums, backing vocals

Artwork
Nick Gamma – art direction, design
Jeff Faerber – illustrations
Chapman Baehler – photography
Diane Schmidtke – groomer 
Mandi Line – stylist

Management
 Mark Adelman – management for Spivak Sobol Entertainment
 Stu Sobol – management for Spivak Sobol Entertainment

Production
 Gavin "Golden" Brown – producer
 George Marino – mastering
 Ted Jensen – mastering on "I Hate Everything About You" and "Just Like You"
 Michael "Elvis" Baskette – engineer 
 Krisjan Leslie – engineer
 Jay Baumgardner – mixing
 Rich Costey – mixing on "Just Like You" and "I Hate Everything About You"
 Randy Staub – mixing on "Burn", "Home" and "Let You Down"
 Dave Holdredge – editing
 Mark Kiczula – assistant engineer
 Mike Lapierre – assistant engineer
 Darren Mora – assistant engineer
 Damien Shannon – assistant engineer
 Alley Trela – assistant engineer
 German Villacorta – assistant engineer

Charts

Weekly charts

Year-end charts

Certifications

References

2003 debut albums
Jive Records albums
Three Days Grace albums
Albums produced by Gavin Brown (musician)